Farewell My Concubine is a 1993 Chinese historical drama film directed by Chen Kaige, starring Leslie Cheung, Gong Li and Zhang Fengyi. Adapted for the screen by Lu Wei based on the novel by Lilian Lee, the film is set in a politically tumultuous 20th-century China, from the early days of the Republic of China to the aftermath of the Cultural Revolution. It chronicles the troubled relationships between two Peking opera actors and lifelong friends Cheng Dieyi (Cheung) and Duan Xiaolou (Zhang), and Xiaolou's wife Juxian (Gong).

The film's themes include confusion of identity and blurred lines between real life and the stage, portrayed by the revered opera actor Dieyi, whose unrequited love for Xiaolou persists throughout. Scholar Ying notes that in order "[to] attract the international audience, Chinese history and Peking Opera are drawn close while homosexuality, individual perversities and moral dilemmas are transposed distant". Commentators also noted themes of political and societal disturbances in 20th-century China, which is typical of the Chinese Fifth Generation cinema.

Farewell My Concubine premiered on January 1, 1993, in Hong Kong. Upon release, the film received generally positive reviews from contemporary critics and won the Palme d'Or at the 1993 Cannes Film Festival, becoming the first Chinese-language film to achieve the honour. It further won accolades including a Golden Globe for Best Foreign Language Film and a BAFTA for Best Film Not in the English Language, and received two nominations at the 66th Academy Awards for Best Cinematography and Best Foreign Language Film.

A few weeks following its China release, the film was abruptly banned by the politburo unless and until major changes be made. While allowing a premiere in Beijing but forbidding release in other cities, the government objected to the representation of homosexuality, the suicide of a leading character and a description of the turmoil during the Communist period in China.

The film was allowed to resume public showings in September 1993, less than a year after its original release. Upon its return the Chinese censors had made numerous cuts, removing 14 minutes. Chinese officials felt that a re-release as opposed to maintaining a full ban would silence ever-growing international backlash and also help their bid to host the Olympic games in Beijing in 2000.

Farewell My Concubine is considered one of the landmark films of the Fifth Generation movement that brought Chinese film directors to world attention. In 2005, the film was selected as one of the "100 Best Films in Global History" by Time magazine.

Plot
In the winter of 1924, Douzi, a boy endowed with feminine features, is taken by his prostitute mother to an all-boys Peking opera troupe supervised by Master Guan. When Guan rejects Douzi from the troupe because of his vestigial sixth finger, Douzi's mother cuts the extra finger off, returns him to the troupe with his hand still bleeding, and abandons him. Douzi is befriended by a fellow student, Shitou.

In 1932, the teenage Douzi is training to play dan (female roles), while Shitou learns jing (painted-face male roles). When practicing the play "Dreaming of the World Outside the Nunnery", Douzi substitutes "I am by nature a boy, not a girl," for the line "I am by nature a girl, not a boy" and is disciplined severely by the instructors. Douzi and another student named Laizi attempt to run away, but Douzi decides to pursue acting seriously after witnessing an opera performance that moves both boys to tears. Upon returning, they find the entire troupe being punished for their desertion. On seeing Shitou being beaten, Douzi takes responsibility for the escape so the masters will hit him instead, and he is beaten severely, stopping only when it is discovered that Laizi has hanged himself.

Na Kun, an agent who provides funding for opera, visits the troupe seeking potential actors. When Douzi repeats his previous mistake in front of the agent, Shitou commands him to start over. Douzi finally whispers, "I am by nature a girl, not a boy." He delivers the entire monologue successfully, to the joy of the troupe, and secures Na's patronage. The troupe is invited to perform for court eunuch Zhang. Shitou and Douzi are taken to Zhang's house, where they find a finely crafted sword, which Douzi expresses the desire to give to Shitou one day. Zhang has Douzi brought to his room, where he sexually assaults him. Douzi does not mention this to anyone, but Shitou implicitly knows what happened. On their way home, Douzi adopts an abandoned baby, who later comes under Master Guan's training.

By 1937, Douzi and Shitou have become stars of the Peking opera, under the stage names Cheng Dieyi (Douzi) and Duan Xiaolou (Shitou). Their signature performance is Farewell My Concubine, in which Dieyi plays the concubine Consort Yu and Xiaolou plays Xiang Yu. Their fame attracts the attention of the high-ranking Yuan Shiqing, who grows enamoured with Dieyi. Yuan compliments his performances, but Dieyi is hesitant to develop a romantic relationship with him, as he harbors an unrequited love for Xiaolou. When Xiaolou impulsively marries Juxian, a headstrong courtesan at an upscale brothel, Dieyi and Xiaolou's relationship begins to fall apart. On the eve of the Marco Polo Bridge Incident, Dieyi discovers that Yuan now owns Zhang's sword, and reluctantly submits to Yuan's amorous advances to obtain it as a gift for Xiaolou. When Xiaolou, in the midst of celebrating his engagement to Juxian, is casually dismissive of the hard-won sword, the hurt and jealous Dieyi dissolves their acting partnership and storms out of the party just before Japanese troops invade. Xiaolou goes to pursue him, but Juxian pulls him back inside the house.

The love triangle between Dieyi, Xiaolou, and Juxian leads to jealousy and betrayal, which is further complicated by the successive political upheavals following the Second Sino-Japanese War. When Xiaolou is imprisoned for striking a Japanese army officer, Juxian begs Dieyi to secure his freedom by singing for the Japanese forces. Dieyi ignores her until she promises she will leave them both and return to the brothel. Dieyi agrees and performs an opera for the high-ranking Aoki and his men, but the freed Xiaolou spits in Dieyi's face when he hears what he has done. Juxian breaks her promise and leaves with Xiaolou, and they soon marry. Dieyi begins an intimate relationship with Yuan.

When Master Guan dies and the child training troupe disbands, the abandoned baby, named Xiao Si, comes under Dieyi's training to continue learning dan roles.
Communist forces win the civil war, and Xiao Si becomes an avid follower of the new government. Dieyi's addiction to opium affects his performances, but he ultimately rehabilitates with the help of Xiaolou and Juxian. Xiao Si nurtures resentment against Dieyi because of his rigorous teaching, and usurps his role in Farewell My Concubine during a performance without anyone warning Dieyi beforehand. Devastated by the betrayal, Dieyi secludes himself and refuses to reconcile with Xiaolou. As the Cultural Revolution continues, the entire opera troupe is forced into a struggle session by the Red Guards where, under pressure, Dieyi and Xiaolou accuse each other of counterrevolutionary acts. Dieyi also tells the guards that Juxian was a prostitute, while Xiaolou publicly implies Dieyi is homosexual. To protect himself from further prosecution, Xiaolou swears that he does not love Juxian and will "make a clean break" with her. Heartbroken, Juxian commits suicide by hanging herself. Xiao Si is later caught by the Red Guards singing Consort Yu's lines while admiring the lavish stage jewelry he took from Dieyi.

In 1977, Dieyi and Xiaolou reunite, seeming to have mended their relationship. They once again practice Farewell My Concubine; midway through, Xiaolou recites the line "I am by nature a boy," and Dieyi makes the same mistake of finishing with "Not a girl." As their performance reaches its climax, Dieyi takes Xiaolou's sword to cut his own throat, paralleling the concubine's final act in the opera. Xiaolou turns in shock and calls out Dieyi's name, and before the screen fades to black, he meekly whispers Dieyi's childhood name, Douzi.

Cast

Production
Chen Kaige was first given a copy of Lilian Lee's novel in 1988, and although Chen found the story of the novel to be "compelling", he found the emotional subtext of the novel "a bit thin".  After meeting with Lee, they recruited Chinese writer Lu Wei for the screenplay, and in 1991 the first draft of the screenplay came about. The director chose the heroic suicide of Dieyi over original story's banality in order to present the "Lie nu" image of Dieyi to emphasize the women's liberation which was commonly found in the Fifth Generation films.

Jackie Chan was originally considered for the role of Cheng Dieyi, but he declined the offer. John Lone later lobbied for the role but failed to progress past contractual negotiations with producer Hsu Feng.

Hong Kong actor Leslie Cheung was used in the film to attract audiences because melodramas were not a popular genre. It was believed that it was the first film where Cheung spoke Mandarin Chinese. However, for most of the movie Cheung's voice is dubbed by Beijing actor Yang Lixin. Director Chen left Cheung's original voice in two scenes, where Cheung's voice is distorted by physical and mental distress. Due to Gong Li's international stardom, she was cast as one of the main characters in the film.

Historical background
The historical background of the film is multi-layered and complicated, which contributes to the motif and the form of the film. The 1990s period saw China trying to do damage control to the country's image after the massacre that happened during the 1989 Tiananmen Square protests. David Shambaugh talks about the government's new agenda that focused on "restoring the appearance of unity in the leadership, ensuring the loyalty of the military, reestablishing social order, reasserting central control over the provinces, recentralizing and retrenching the economy, and redefining China's role in a post-Cold War international environment". In addition to the mentioned changes in the political climate, at the time of the film's release, the atmosphere around the criticism of Cultural Revolution shifted. As Luo Hui notes "criticizing the Cultural Revolution had become permissible, even fashionable", allowing the film to highlight the devastation the world of art, as well as other aspects of Chinese society like medicine and education, suffered at the hands of the Cultural Revolution movement.

Release

Release in China
The film premiered in Shanghai in July 1993 but was removed from theatres after two weeks for further censorial review and subsequently banned in August. Because the film won the Palme d'Or at the 1993 Cannes Film Festival, the ban was met with international outcry. Feeling there was "no choice" and fearing it hurt China's bid for the 2000 Summer Olympics, officials allowed the film to resume public showings in September. This release was censored; scenes dealing with the Cultural Revolution and homosexuality were cut, and the final scene was revised to "soften the blow of the suicide".

Box office and reception
The film was released to three theaters on 15 October 1993, and grossed $69,408 in the opening weekend. Its final grossing in the US market is $5,216,888.

In 2005, some 25,000 Hong Kong film-enthusiasts voted it their favorite Chinese-language film of the century (the second was Wong Kar-wai's Days of Being Wild).

International audience
The international perspective was put into question by critics who are concerned that the film's visual and artistic settings are too culturally inherent. On the other hand, the contents are internationally applicable. The enriching contexts, symbols and political icons are turned into colorful Oriental spectacles that arouse Westerner's fantasies. China's image is used as an object of signification, a cultural exhibition on display and a major selling point. Thus, they charge the film for dancing to the tunes set forth by the Western cultural imaginary about China.

Some critics point to the fact that Chen had engineered the film to fit domestic and international audiences' taste, as Chen understands the international audience's perceptions and attitudes towards Chinese history, and sexuality.

Miramax edited version
At Cannes, the film was awarded the highest prize, the Palme d'Or. Miramax Films mogul Harvey Weinstein purchased distribution rights and removed fourteen minutes, resulting in a 157-minute cut. This is the version seen theatrically in the United States and United Kingdom.

According to Peter Biskind's book, Down and Dirty Pictures: Miramax, Sundance and the Rise of Independent Film, Louis Malle, Cannes jury president that year, said: "The film we admired so much in Cannes is not the film seen in this country [the U.S.], which is twenty minutes shorter – but seems longer because it doesn't make any sense. It was better before those guys made cuts."

The uncut 171-minute version has been released by Miramax on DVD.

Music and soundtrack

Reception

Critical reception
Roger Ebert awarded the film four stars, praising the plot as "almost unbelievably ambitious" and executed with "freedom and energy". The New York Times critic Vincent Canby hailed it for "action, history, exotic color", positively reviewing the acting of Gong Li, Leslie Cheung and Zhang Fengyi. In New York, David Denby criticized the "spectacle" but felt it would be worthy of excelling in international cinema, portraying a triumph of love and culture despite dark moments. Hal Hinson, writing for The Washington Post, highlighted "its swooning infatuation with the theater- with its colors, its vitality and even its cruel rigors". Desson Howe was less positive, writing the first half had impact but gives way to "novel-like meandering", with less point.

The film was included in The New York Times list of The Best 1000 Movies Ever Made in 2004 and Times list of Best Movies of All Time in 2005. It was ranked  97 in Empire magazine's "The 100 Best Films Of World Cinema" in 2010, and No. 1 in Time Out'''s "100 Best Mainland Chinese Films" feature in 2014. The film has an 87% approval rating on Rotten Tomatoes based on 38 reviews, with an average rating of 7.60/10. The critics consensus reads, "Chen Kaing's epic is grand in scope and presentation, and, bolstered by solid performances, the result is a film both horrifying and enthralling." The BBC placed the film at number 12 on its 2018 list of the 100 greatest foreign language films. It ranked at number 55 on the Hong Kong Film Awards Association (HKFAA)'s list of the Best 100 Chinese-Language Motion Pictures in 2005. The public ranked Farewell My Concubine atop a 2005 poll of the most beloved films in Hong Kong conducted by Handerson ArtReach.

Year-end lists 
6th – Joan Vadeboncoeur, Syracuse Herald AmericanTop 10 (not ranked) – Dennis King, Tulsa WorldAccolades
At Cannes, the film tied for the Palme d'Or with Jane Campion's The Piano from New Zealand. Farewell My Concubine remains the only Chinese-language film to win the Palme d'Or at the Cannes Film Festival.

See also
Cinema of China
Cinema of Hong Kong
List of submissions to the 66th Academy Awards for Best Foreign Language Film
List of Hong Kong submissions for the Academy Award for Best Foreign Language Film

References
Notes

Citations

Further reading

Braester, Yomi. Farewell My Concubine: National Myth and City Memories. In Chinese Films in Focus: 25 New Takes, edited by Chris Berry, 89–96. London: British Film Institute, 2003.

Kaplan, Ann. Reading Formations and Chen Kaige's Farewell My Concubine. In Sheldon Lu, ed., Transnational Chinese Cinema: Identity, Nationhood, Gender. Honolulu: University of Hawaiʻi Press, 1997.
Larson, Wendy. The Concubine and the Figure of History: Chen Kaige's Farewell My Concubine. In Sheldon Lu, ed., Transnational Chinese Cinema: Identity, Nationhood, Gender. Honolulu: University of Hawaiʻi Press, 1997; also published as Bawang bieji: Ji yu lishi xingxiang, Qingxiang (1997); also in Harry Kuoshu, ed., Chinese Film, ed. Bloomington: Indiana University Press, 2000.
Lau, Jenny Kwok Wah. Farewell My Concubine': History, Melodrama, and Ideology in Contemporary Pan-Chinese Cinema. Film Quarterly 49, 1 (Fall, 1995).
Lim, Song Hwee. The Uses of Femininity: Chen Kaige's Farewell My Concubine and Zhang Yuan's East Palace, West Palace. In Lim, Celluloid Comrades: Representations of Male Homosexuality in Contemporary Chinese Cinemas. Honolulu: University of Hawaiʻi, 2006, pages 69–98.
Lu, Sheldon Hsiao-peng. "National Cinema, Cultural Critique, Transnational Capital: The Films of Zhang Yimou." In Transnational Chinese Cinema, edited by Sheldon Lu, 105–39. Honolulu: [University of Hawaiʻi Press]], page 199.
McDougall, Bonnie S. "Cross-dressing and the Disappearing Woman in Modern Chinese Fiction, Drama and Film: Reflections on Chen Kaige's Farewell My Concubine." China Information 8, 4 (Summer 1994): pages 42–51.
Metzger, Sean. "Farewell My Fantasy." The Journal of Homosexuality 39, 3/4 (2000): pages 213–32. Rpt. in Andrew Grossman, ed. Queer Asian Cinema: Shadows in the Shade. New York: Harrington Press, 2000, pages 213–232.
Xu, Ben. "Farewell My Concubine and Its Western and Chinese Viewers." Quarterly Review of Film and Television 16, 2 (1997).

Zhang, Benzi. "Figures of Violence and Tropes of Homophobia: Reading Farewell My Concubine between East and West." Journal of Popular Culture: Comparative Studies in the World's Civilizations'' 33, 2 (1999): pages 101–109.

External links

A film review with emphasis on the relationship between the play and the film 

1993 films
1993 romantic drama films
1993 LGBT-related films
Chinese romantic drama films
Chinese LGBT-related films
1990s Mandarin-language films
Films directed by Chen Kaige
Best Foreign Language Film Golden Globe winners
Films based on Chinese novels
Films about Peking opera
Films set in Beijing
Films about the Cultural Revolution
Palme d'Or winners
Second Sino-Japanese War films
Best Foreign Language Film BAFTA Award winners
Films with screenplays by Lilian Lee